Menzies was an electoral district of the Legislative Assembly in the Australian state of Western Australia from 1901 to 1930.

The district was located in the north of the Eastern Goldfields. On its creation in 1900, it included the towns of Menzies, Goongarrie, Niagara, Yerilla, Tampa, Mount Ida, Mulline, and Callion. When the district was abolished at the 1930 state election, sitting member Alexander Panton transferred to the Perth based seat of Leederville.

Members for Menzies

Election results

References

Menzies
1901 establishments in Australia
1930 disestablishments in Australia
Constituencies established in 1901
Constituencies disestablished in 1930